Homaloptera parclitella is a species of ray-finned fish in the genus Homaloptera found in Malay Peninsula.

References

Fish of Thailand
Homaloptera
Fish described in 2005